Steve Selvin (born 1941) is an American statistician who is a professor emeritus of biostatistics at the University of California, Berkeley.

Selvin joined the faculty of the School of Public Health at UC Berkeley in 1972 and in 1977 he became the head of its biostatistics division. As the head of Undergraduate Management Committee he was instrumental in the development of the school's undergraduate program. In addition to his work at UC Berkeley he also served from 1990 to 1998 as an adjunct professor of epidemiology at the University of Michigan and since 2005 as a professor of biostatistics at the Johns Hopkins University in Baltimore.

UC Berkeley bestowed several awards on Selvin for his achievements in teaching. He received the Berkeley Distinguished Teaching Award in 1983 and the School of Public Health Distinguished Teaching Award in 1998. In 2011 at the age of 70 he was awarded a Berkeley Citation. Selvin published over 200 papers and authored several textbooks in the fields of biostatistics and epidemiology.

In February 1975 Selvin published a letter entitled A Problem in Probability in the American Statistician. In it he posed and solved a problem, which was later to become known as the Monty Hall problem. After receiving some criticism for his suggested solution Selvin wrote a follow-up letter entitled On the Monty Hall Problem, which was published in August of the same year. This was the first time the phrase "Monty Hall Problem" appeared in print. In this second letter Selvin proposed a solution based on Bayes' theorem and explicitly outlined some assumptions concerning the moderator's behavior. The problem remained relatively  unknown until it was published again by Marilyn vos Savant in her column for Parade magazine in 1990. This publication generated a lot of controversy and made the problem widely known throughout the world. As a result quite a few papers were published on the Monty Hall Problem generated over the years and it is featured in many introductory probability & statistics classes and textbooks.

Selvin lives in the Berkeley, California area and is married to sculptor Nancy Selvin, the epidemiologist Elizabeth Selvin is his daughter.

Works
A Problem in Probability. The American Statistician, February 1975 (first publication of the Monty Hall Problem, online copy at JSTOR)
On the Monty Hall Problem. The American Statistician, August 1975 (first literal mentioning of the phrase "Monty Hall Problem", online copy (excerpt))
Statistical Analysis of Epidemiologic Data. Oxford University Press,  New York, 1991, 3. edition 2004, 
Modern Applied Biostatistical Methods Using SPLUS. Oxford University Press, New York, 1998, 
Epidemiologic Analysis: a case-oriented approach.  Oxford University Press,  New York, 2001, 
Biostatistics:  How it works.  Prentice Hall, New York, 2004, 
Survival Analysis for epidemiologic and Medical Research Analysis of Epidemiologic Data. Cambridge University Press,  New York, 2008, 
Statistical Tools for Epidemiologic Research. Oxford University Press, 2011, 
The Joy Of Statistics: A Treasury Of Elementary Statistical Tools And Their Applications. Oxford University Press, 2019

References

External links
http://steveselvinphotography.com/
http://sph.berkeley.edu/steve-selvin

American statisticians
1941 births
Living people
University of Michigan faculty
University of California, Berkeley faculty
Johns Hopkins University faculty